Ayten Sokak is a notable and historical street in Mebusevleri (MP Houses) neighbourhood of Çankaya district in Ankara, Turkey.

The street was the base of the parliament members from the Republican People's Party (CHP) and its leader and former President İsmet İnönü, who regularly visited the street for personal and official activities.

Ayten Sokak is about 5 minutes from the city centre (Kizilay).

Streets in Ankara
Transportation in Ankara